Cumbre is a genus of skippers in the family Hesperiidae.

Species
Recognised species in the genus Cumbre include:
 Cumbre cumbre (Schaus, 1902)

References

Natural History Museum Lepidoptera genus database

Hesperiinae
Hesperiidae genera